Sesquithujene synthase (EC 4.2.3.102, TPS5-Del1) is an enzyme with systematic name (2E,6E)-farnesyl-diphosphate diphosphate-lyase (sesquithujene-forming). This enzyme catalyses the following chemical reaction

 (2E,6E)-farnesyl diphosphate  sesquithujene + diphosphate

The enzyme from Zea mays, variety Delprim, gives mainly sesquithujene.

References

External links 
 

EC 4.2.3